Mahbod (also known as Mebodes), was a 6th-century Iranian ambassador and military officer from the House of Suren, who was active during the reign of the Sasanian shahanshahs Khosrow I and Hormizd IV.

Biography 

A member of the House of Suren, he was perhaps the son or grandson of his namesake Mahbod, who was active under the shahanshahs Kavad I and Khosrow I. He is first mentioned in late 567, when he was sent as an envoy to the Byzantine capital of Constantinople to reach an agreement over the Lazican region of Suania. Although emperor Justin II accepted a letter addressed to him by Khosrow I, he ignored Mahbod and refused to grant him an audience. Mahbod then attempted to reach out to Justinian through an envoy of Lakhmids who had accompanied him, but to no avail. After an Iranian proposal of a five-year truce was rejected by emperor Tiberius II Constantine in 574/575, Mahbod sent Tamkhosrow to raid the surroundings of the fortress of Dara. However, the Romans soon proposed a three-year truce in exchange for 30,000 gold, which Mahbod accepted.

In 576, when Mahbod held the title of Sar-nakhveraghan ("chief of the governors"), he was sent by Khosrow I to negotiate peace with the Byzantine emissaries Theodorus, Ioannes, Petrus and Zacharias. The meeting took place in Athraelon, on the outskirts of Dara, and negotiations dragged on until 577, due to both parties blaming each other for start of the war. Mahbod proposal for peace in exchange for annual payments was rejected by the Romans, and thus hostilities resumed. In June 578, Khosrow I appointed Mahbod the head of an Iranian expedition in Mesopotamia: the force, which consisted of 12,000 Iranians and 8,000 Arabs, ravaged the areas around Resaina and Constantia. At the same time, Mahbod sent Tamkhosrow to attack the surroundings of Martyropolis and Amida.

In 579, the newly ascended shahanshah Hormizd IV sent Mahbod to interrogate and dismiss the Byzantine emissaries Zacharias and Theodorus from the Iranian court. In the spring of 586, Mahbod was a provincial governor, perhaps of a frontier province. He was sent to negotiate with the Byzantine commander Philippicus at Amida. Negotiations, however, broke down after Mahbod's demand for gold in exchange for peace was rejected. Not long after, an Iranian force—led by Kardarigan, Aphraates and Mahbod—suffered a heavy defeat against the Byzantines at the Battle of Solachon.

In the spring/summer of 589, Hormizd IV sent Mahbod to attack Philippicus, who was outside Martyropolis. Another force under Aphraates was also dispatched, due to Mahbod's forces proving insufficient. Although the Iranians won the battle, Mahbod was killed by a Byzantine projectile.

References

Sources 
 
 
 
 

589 deaths
House of Suren
Generals of Khosrow I
Generals of Hormizd IV
People of the Roman–Sasanian Wars
6th-century Iranian people
Diplomats of the Sasanian Empire
Ambassadors to the Byzantine Empire
6th-century diplomats